Somchanh Chitvongdeuan is a Laotian politician. She is a member of the Lao People's Revolutionary Party. She is a representative of the National Assembly of Laos for Oudomxay Province (Constituency 4).

References

Members of the National Assembly of Laos
Lao People's Revolutionary Party politicians
Year of birth missing (living people)
Living people
21st-century Laotian women politicians
21st-century Laotian politicians